Saori (written: 沙織, 早織, 佐織, 砂織, 沙保里, 沙緒里, 紗央里, 紗央莉, 左多里 or さおり in hiragana) is a feminine Japanese given name. Notable people with the name include:

 Saori (television personality) (born 1981), Japanese-Korean model and singer
, Japanese women's footballer
, Japanese volleyball player
, Japanese women's footballer
, Japanese singer-songwriter
, Japanese voice actress and singer
, Japanese AV actress
, Japanese swimmer
, Japanese voice actress and singer
, Japanese gravure idol
, Japanese politician
, Japanese rhythmic gymnast
, Japanese mixed martial artist, kickboxer and karateka
, Japanese volleyball player
, Japanese sprinter
, Japanese video game composer and pianist
Saori Kondo (born 1956), Japanese badminton player
, Japanese idol and singer
, Japanese archer
, Japanese tennis player
, Japanese manga artist
Saori Sarina Ohno (born 1970), German classical pianist
, Japanese voice actress
, Japanese model and actress
, Japanese badminton player
, Japanese volleyball player
, Japanese voice actress
, Japanese voice actress
, Japanese freestyle skier
, Japanese volleyball player
, Japanese gravure idol
, Japanese sport wrestler
, Japanese politician
, Japanese singer and actress

Fictional characters
, a character in the anime series Girls und Panzer

See also
Saori@destiny, Japanese musician

Japanese feminine given names